is a Japanese television series that aired on TV Asahi and its affiliates from January 24, 1988, to January 22, 1989, lasting 50 episodes. It was the seventh installment in Toei's Metal Hero Series franchise of live-action superhero shows and the last of the Showa era. The series centers around a young ninja master named Toha Yamaji, who must face numerous ninja masters from different parts of the world by donning a special armor to become his alter-ego Jiraiya.

The English title given by Toei's international sales department is Ninja Olympiad, a reference to the Seoul Olympics & the Calgary Olympics that was held at the time the series was airing. The show was aired in the Philippines on ABS-CBN from 1991 to 1992. Jiraiya's suit would later be used in Power Rangers Super Ninja Steel, using footage from Shuriken Sentai Ninninger, where Jiraiya had an appearance.

Story
Tetsuzan Yamaji is the 34th grandmaster of the Togakure Ryū Ninpō, sworn to guard a stone tablet detailing the location of an artifact of untold power called the Pako which came to Earth. But a fallen disciple of Togakure Ryū Ninpō named Dokusai stole one-half of the tablet years prior and established the Sorcerers Clan to steal the rest. Besides his daughter Kei and her younger brother Manabu, Tetsuzan entrusts their clan's sacred duty to his adopted son Toha while bestowing the Jiraiya Suit that has been in their family for generations. As Jiraiya, Toha faces the Sorcerers Clan along with numerous ninjas gathering from around the world to acquire the Pako for their own agendas.

Characters

Yamaji Family

 /: The protagonist. The 19-year-old (46 years old in Ninninger) adoptive son of Tetsuzan Yamaji. He has been given the task of protecting the Yamaji's half of the clay tablet showing the location of the Secret Treasure Pako. To become Jiraiya, he wears the Jiraiya Suit and wields the deadly  to defeat evildoers. He later gains the ability to upgrade his Jiraiya Suit by equipping over it the Jiraiya Power Protector. He works several part-time jobs to support his family. Toha is actually a descendant of the alien that brought the Pako to Earth 2300 years before the start of the series. Decades after the Sorcerers clan's fall, Toha makes a guest appearance in episode 34 of Shuriken Sentai Ninninger. He later appoints a successor, Touma Amagi, who inherits his suit and appears in Uchu Sentai Kyuranger vs. Space Squad.
 /: Tetsuzan's daughter, a 16-year-old high school freshman. She often teases her adoptive brother Toha, leaving most of the housework and chores to him, but cares deeply about him. When she dresses as Emiha to assist Jiraiya, she wears a white ninja armor similar to Jiraiya's.
 : Tetsuzan's young son, a 9-years-old third grade student. He becomes dissatisfied with himself after feeling that his older siblings and father treat him as being only half-capable as they are. He eventually creates a homemade battle armor as he becomes more involved in the war against the Sorcerers Clan, wielding a slingshot with steel marbles as his main arsenal. He is also a talented artist when it comes to drawing portraits. Manabu makes a guest appearance in episode 31 of Kidou Keiji Jiban.
 : The 34th Grandmaster of the Togakure-ryū Ninpō school. The adoptive father of Toha and biological father to Kei and Manabu. His wife  was the daughter of Tetsuzan's master, but she was killed during a crossfire between Tetsuzan and the Sorcerers Clan eight years prior to the start of the series (when Manabu was an infant). He opened the  ninpo dojo at his own apartment complex, but has received very few students outside his own children. One of his most notable characteristics is his great knowledge of the World Ninjas.

International Secret Police

 / - A mysterious kunoichi descended from the Shadow Yagyu clan. She holds a secret power which she releases when her pupils glow green and uses a ninjato. Like Toha, she is descended from the alien that brought Pako to Earth, thus she is the only person whose blood type is compatible with Toha's. In Episode 11 she overuses her power and suffers a memory loss as a result, but she eventually recovered when was almost being killed by Dokusai, in the episode 24.
 / - A young spear-wielding ninja who works together with Rei. He was played by Issei Hirota, who previously played Akira/Blue Mask in Hikari Sentai Maskman. In the end of the episode 24, the narrator says that Ryu Asuka has accepted a mission and would left Japan for a short time, even though he will never more be seen in the show.

Allies
 : A British ninja descended from a Crusader who is a devout Christian, dressed like a knight in a golden helmet who rides a white horse named . While he sought the Pako in memory of those who died for their faith, he becomes Jiraiya's ally.
 : A mohawk and black mask-donning Turkish ninja who is a devout Muslim with a preference of sleeping outdoors due to his loud snoring, tasked with the protection of the Green Flame, a precious emerald from the Topkapi Palace. Wields a large knife and sword, as well as a Kusari-fundo. In Episode 3, he is tricked into fighting Jiraiya by the Sorcerers Clan, but reconciles with him by the end of the episode. In Episode 15, he inadvertently releases Manin Sylvia from her prison and returns to Japan to seek Jiraiya's assistance.
 : A wandering ninja who collects valuable swords, his mastery of various sword fighting skills and ninjutsu making himfeared by even Dokusai himself. He wields lizard-shaped throwing stars and bombs, as well as a hand cannon, while having the ability to transform into a large lizard. In Episode 5, he attempts to challenge Jiraiya for the Optical-magnetized Light Vacuum Sword, but fails. He becomes Jiraiya's ally and in Episode 31, he discovers the Nobutora, a sword that belonged to Shingen Takeda, that was stolen from a museum in Paris, but is forced to return it to authorities. In Episode 41, he becomes possessed when he wields the Dark Sword that originally belonged to Demost.
 : An American ninja who specializes in explosives and gunpowder. Wields a rocket launcher, which he usually carries on his back and wields a dagger for close-combat. However, he is not adept at close-quarters combat. A Vietnam War veteran, he decided to flee from the conflict after he encountered a young girl named  whose parents were killed. He faked his death and adopted Tao as his own daughter. In Episode 14, he goes to Japan for the first time in order to clear his name after the Sorcerers Clan framed for a bombing and kidnapping he didn't commit. In Episode 44, he is forced to fight Jiraiya against his will when Tao is kidnapped by the Sorcerers Clan. After Tao is rescued, he returns alongside Mafuuba and Wild in order to assist Jiraiya in the final battle against the Sorcerers. His ninja mask is a conical hood resembling a rocket.
 : An American ninja from the West descended from Billy the Kid. He works as a bounty hunter and calls himself the "Ninja Sheriff from the North Army". His ninja outfit is made of blue denim. Wields a Magnum revolver along with a knife. In Episode 20, he hunts down Jiraiya in order to collect the bounty offered by the Sorcerers Clan, but joins forces with Jiraiya in the end when the Sorcerers betrays him. Afterward, he begins working for a public entertaining company in order to collect money to pay for his trip back to America and ends up challenging Jiraiya again in Episode 33 to duel. From that point onward, he becomes one of Jiraiya's recurring ally in the battle again the Sorcerers Clan.
 : A member of the Holy Ninja Clan, a religious clan that inhabit the desert lands. Wields a large katana and a knife. He has several Ninpo skills such as creating a Sand Blizzard that seals his enemies' weapons in sand, throwing stars that feeds from certain energy sources, the ability to levitate giant objects, and so on. The red stone on his head is the source of his powers. He is ignorant of modern society due to his upbringing. In Episode 21, he is tricked by the Sorcerers Clan into blackmailing the Governor of Tokyo and stealing all of the gasoline in Tokyo, but he is taught the errors of his way by Jiraiya and becomes his ally. In Episode 47, he is brainwashed by Madam Spider into destroying Jiraishin, but he comes to his senses before he could accomplish such a task.
 : A fortune-telling half-Japanese female ninja from Canada who seeks to help her poor hometown. She can shoot a Diamond Shower from her chest. Demost uses her good intentions against her by forcing her to lead Jiraiya to a trap, but ended up saving him instead by giving up her own life.
 : A ninja who can manipulate paper, he is employed by his own clan to hunt down deserters. He first appears in Episode 12, where he is assigned to hunt down a deserter named . However, he is reluctant to finish job, having had a romantic relationship in the past with Mimura's daughter . After Mimura is killed, Oruha abandons the clan to elope with Kasumi. He retires and moves to Yamanakako with Kasumi, but is brought back into action in Episode 26 after becoming involved in a plot by the Sorcerers Clan. He has ability to create paper doll minions and uses dismantled scissors as throwing knives. In Episode 45, he and Kasumi are both killed by his former clan leader, but they are both brought back to life by the powers of Jiraishin.
 : A female ninja apprentice from the Flower Ninja Clan, a clan from Lake Hamana which branched off from the Togakure school. She was raised by the clan's leader  as his own after being abandoned by her birth parents when she was an infant. She was given the task of preventing the cursed armor of the Devil King from falling into the wrong hands. She has the ability to use falling flower petals as weapons, as well as the small branches from cherry blossom trees. She is assisted by Jiraiya in Episodes 17 and 18, and returns in Episode 32 to team up with Emiha and Reiha.
 : After the Special Ninja Team was defeated, the Sorcerers Clan revived Kaze by turning him into a cyborg ninja. Mafuuba has all abilities from his deceased Special Ninja Team comrades in addition to his own, while fully overcoming his phobia of strong winds. Although an enemy of Jiraiya at first, he was unable to tolerate the injustices committed by the Sorcerers and departed from the group to become Jiraiya's ally. The name "Mafūba" translates "Destroying Wind Horse".
 : A comical fortune teller who gets himself involved with the activities of Toha and co. Although he was trained to become a ninja, he gave up and ran away from his master's place. Has a one-sided crush on Mei.
 : An American scientist who was also Tetsuzan's first disciple. He defected to Japan with the help of Tetsuzan, fearing the way his research was being used for the "Star Wars Project". He dreams of combining his scientific technology with the ways of Ninpō to help protect the world. In his first appearance in Episode 11, he repairs and improves the Jiraiya Suit after it was damaged in battle by Chang Kung-Fu Jr. and Lu Long, building the Power Protector upgrade parts as well. In Episode 16, he takes Toha's beloved car and rebuilds it into the Black Saber. When he was kidnapped by Gamesh alongside his colleagues Dr. Brown and Dr. Schmidt in Episode 23, he managed to escape using a Ninpō trick taught to him by Tetsuzan. He also wielded a fountain pen equipped with a laser gun that alters an enemy's brainwaves.
 : Appears in Episode 27 played by Metal Hero veteran Kenji Ohba. A skilled warrior formerly from the Togakure school who seeks to challenge the best, he is known for his unpredictable behavior. He lives in the city of Matsuyama at Shikoku, but is asked by Tetsuzan to visit Tokyo in order to discourage Toha from becoming too arrogant. He does so by challenging Toha to an unarmed match for the ownership of the Jiraiya Suit and the Optical-magnetized Light Vacuum Sword. After being defeated by Yajiro, Toha goes through an intensive training program in order to defeat him. Toha learns a new skill that allows to blank out his mind and augment his entire body's senses in order to better predict attacks. Toha defeats Yajiro in the rematch and reclaims his armor and sword.
 : Appears in Episodes 29, 31 and 40. A French policewoman and ninja who travels to Japan undercover as a tourist in order to recover the Nobutora Sword, which was stolen by Parchis from a museum in Paris.

The Sorcerers Clan

The  are the main antagonists of the series led by the patriarch Dokusai. They possess half of the Inscription which contains the location of Pako (with the other half being with the Yamaji).
 : The leader of the Sorcerers Clan, whose true face is concealed with an Oni mask. He was formerly a student of the Togakure school who trained alongside Tetsuzan before he his greed compelled him to steal the clay map, escaping with one half and establishing the Sorcerers Clan. He begins to demonstrate his true powers from Episode 37 and onward, as he shows various skills such as shooting ray of lights from his arms or confusing Jiraiya by changing his face to that of Tetsuzan's. He was revealed to be entirely faceless during the final episode.
 : Dokusai's daughter. A master of disguises who can assume the shape of any person, from a young schoolgirl to Toha himself. She surrenders and escapes during the final battle. The name "Benikiba" translates to "crimson fang".
 : A young ninja from the Sorcerers Clan who spearheads its frontline activities. He can shoot rays of light from the cross-shaped shuriken on his mask, as well as produce fire through sorcery. He is also a skilled archer. Just like Benikiba, he surrenders and escapes alive in the end. The name "Retsukiba" means "Violent Fang". His most and only notable performance occurred at the first episode of the series, in a climactic battle against Jiraiya.

 : Bird-like underlings of the Sorcerers Clan who work primarily in groups of three. Their weapons include calthrop bombs and dart-shooting blowguns. They're easily defeated in battle due to being incredible weak. They fly by making a breaststroke-like gesture. They always end their phrases with the onomatopoeia "yansu".
 : A female ninja closely acquainted with Dokusai who can change between two different human forms (a "front" form and a "rear" form) or into a spider. She first appears in Episode 37. She uses weapons such as spider-shaped bombs and electric discharging spider-web and even has the magic powers to summon the souls of deceased World Ninjas into the living world. Her regular human form is known as her "front form", while the one she uses as a public disguise is her "rear form". She has a flirtatious, but respectful relationship with Dokusai.
 : An elite group of five ninjas chosen by the Sorcerers Clan in Episode 16. Each member has a skill which utilizes the elements they're named after: Hi can engulfed his whole body in flames and throw fireballs; Mizu can swim in high speed in water and use high water pressure in his attacks; Ki can turn himself into wood and ram himself into the enemy; Tsuchi can launch attacks from underground; and Kaze can rush attack in high-speed by surrounding his body in a tornado, as well control the wind itself. Kaze is afraid of the sound of raging winds due to the fact that he lost his parents on a night with strong winds. He studied his art with the hopes of overcoming his fear, which proves unsuccessful when the group fought Jiraiya.
  and : Two mercenaries employed by the Sorcerers Clan during Episodes 34 and 35. Killer wields a kusarigama, while Commando uses a shotgun and a long spear.
 : A giant beast that Dokusai managed to revive using a wicked magical skull in Episodes 34 and 35. He brandishes a spear and fires out flames from his mouth when angry.

Demost
 is an alien who serves as the main antagonist for the series finale, originating from the  before being sealed underground at Mount Kongō by Jiraiya's ancestor around the 4th century B.C. But Demost is released due to a change in the Earth's crust caused by Jiraishin's resurrection, plotting to acquire the Pako and use its power to return to his homeworld. Demost later appears in Uchu Sentai Kyuranger vs. Space Squad as a member of the Genmaku cult, using the Neo Kyutamas in an attempt to take over the Kyurangers' universe and offer it to Guru Fumein. But he is defeated by the Kyurangers and the Star Sheriffs, ending up in the latter group's custody.

Demost can detach his head from his body and float in the air, as well as be restored after being destroyed once. He can attack and bind his enemies with electric shocks from his hands and his face, as well as read his opponent's mind.

World Ninjas
 : A free-agent ninja master of disguises who cooperates with the Sorcerers Clan in Episodes 19 and 22. In Episode 31, he steals the treasured Nobutora Sword from a museum in Paris in cooperation with a group of international thieves, but his plot is foiled by Jiraiya. He cooperates with the Sorcerers Clan again in Episodes 40 and 48 before he is defeated for good.
 : A 90-year-old ninja from Hong Kong who can control fire. In Episode 4, he cooperates with the Sorcerers Clan in order to obtain the Pako for the purposes achieving eternal youth and immortality. His weapons include a Ninjatō, a kusarigama, a nunchaku, and a three-sectioned staff. He wrap his opponents with his kusarigama, as well as attack them with his illusionary flames. After Chang Kung-Fu is defeated, his son seeks revenge on Jiraiya in Episodes 10 and 11. The son, in addition to having the same outfit and abilities as his father, uses a specially prepared type of Ramen noodles from Hong Kong that ties the mobility of his opponents.
 : A member of a drug cartel from Hong Kong who cooperates with the Sorcerers Clan in Episodes 10 and 11. He has a grudge against Toppa for interfering in his deals in the past. He is a master of the Drunken Fist who wields a Green Dragon Blade and a nunchaku. He can distract his adversaries with his illusions while striking continuously with his nunchaku, as well as create "flame dragon" that attacks with its claws and illusionary flames. He defeated Jiraiya with the help of Chang Kung-Fu's son during their first battle, but both are defeated during the second battle. Voiced by Eisuke Yoda with stunt acting by Tsutomu Kitagawa. The name Lu-Long means "Green Dragon".
 : A ninja employed by a guerrilla group from Kenya. In Episode 7, he becomes involved a smuggling operation with Japan's Miyamura Commercial Affairs, trading the furs of animals he has poached for weapons. He was responsible for the death of Jou, a beloved student of Tetsuzan who was also the chief of the African Wildlife Poaching Control. When the Yamaji family receives news of Jou's death, Jiraiya decides to challenge Makumba, becoming involved with the Miyamura corporation as well. After being defeated by Jiraiya,  appears in Episode 25 to seek revenge. With the help of the Sorcerers Clan, Makumba's brother captures several animals and causes them to shriek loudly in front of the statue of the evil African god Dada. This causes Makumba's spirit to be brought back to life and challenge Jiraiya.
 : A ninja from the fictional  who appears in Episode 8. He is uncle of a young girl named Maira, who was chosen to serve peace ambassador on behalf of Amel. He plots the assassination of his niece in order to turn Amel back into a dictatorial monarchy. Not wanting to kill his elder brother's daughter with his own hands, he hires the Sorcerers Clan to do the deed by paying them with  diamond. His weapons includes a dagger and a double-barreled handgun. He also uses a ninpo technique that allows him to cause large explosions with a mysterious type of powder. His ninja mask is a turban that wraps his entire face.
 : First appears in Episode 43. He once challenge Tetsuzan for the title of world's best ninja, but lost his right arm in the ensuing battle. After the battle, he replaced his missing arm with a prosthetic one and began to train to seek revenge on Tetsuzan. He decides to do so by targeting Toha. His  causes his opponents to become blind by shooting them with one million volts of flashing lights from the chest of his golden armor. After Jiraiya becomes blind from his technique, the only thing that can cure him is the root of a red Yamayuri flower that grows only in Mount Kumotori.
 : Appears in Episodes 17 and 18. A member of the Flower Ninja Clan, he was raised by the clan's master after being orphaned as a child similarly to Yumeha. However, he became corrupt and conspired with half of the clan to conquer the world, assassinating his former master in the process.
 : A surviving member of the cruel Sound Ninja Clan who dresses like a Komusō. He cooperates with the Sorcerers Clan to seek revenge on the Togakure school for destroying his clan. When he plays his shakuhachi, he can control his adversary with his , as well as cause an illusionary group of ninjas to appear within a fog with his . Although he is defeated by Jiraiya, he is brought back to life by Dokusai in Episode 32 and begins summoning ghosts at the beach dormitory of the Saint Mariana Girl School in order to lure out a powerful psychic girl and bring her under his control.
 : An assassin descended from a Caribbean pirate who swims the seas in search of riches. He specializes in underwater combat and wields a harpoon gun. In Episode 24, he cooperates with the Sorcerers Clan in search of Captain Cook's treasure. He returns in Episode 40 to cooperate with the Sorcerers Clan alongside Parchis, but is caught in one of Gamesh 002's traps. He returns again in Episode 48, where he is defeated for good.
 : Appears in Episode 30. A young shinobi who was raised and trained by the ancient ninja master . Despite being trained by Koshimura to be a champion of justice, being the one who gave Black Thorn his name, Black Thorn rejected his master's values after his mother's death and turned to a life of crime by becoming a bank robber, believing that he could've saved his mother's life if he had money. Presumed dead after a fight with his former master, he returns four years later to plot revenge on Koshimura by framing him for various bombing and blackmailing incidents against the Government. He uses rose thorns as weapons.
 : Appears in Episode 45. The cold-blooded leader of Oruha's ninja clan, turning his clan into an assassin group to kill people for gold. He cooperates with the Sorcerers Clan to seize Oruha and Kazumi for deserting the clan.
 : A ninja from Cambodia who seeks to defeat Jiraiya in order to become the world's best ninja and obtain the Pako board. He can shoot an electric shock from his horn. He can create underlings from his own colorful cloth. The original Gyuma is defeated by Jiraiya in Episode 13, but his identity is later assumed by a successor. In Episode 42,  sends a female ninja named , a dead-ringer of Tetsuzan's late wife, to spy on the Yamaji family. However, Akiko betrays the second Gyuma after befriending the Yamaji family, particularly Manabu.
 : A cursed armor said to turn its wearer into an Asura. It is invulnerable to arrows and bullets, as it emits a powerful aura that can use its opponent's feelings against themselves. When Jiraiya approached the Devil King by lowering his fighting spirit, the Devil King's sword proved to be of no use at that moment. After Kurozaru is defeated, the Devil King is sealed away from the rest of the world once again.

Other Enemies
 : Appears in Episode 15. She has the power to hypnotize people she comes in contact with and bring them under her control, as the ability to shoot lightning bolts from her Devil Sword. She is shown to be powerful enough to take on the entire Sorcerers Clan by herself.
 : Appears in Episode 28. He kept himself hidden for 17 years in a hideout within the Togakure mountain range alongside his army of minions. When Sugitani decides to come out of hiding to attack the Togakure village, he is challenged by Jiraiya, who sought to avenge his parents. His name comes from Zenjubo Sugitani
 : An international jewel thief who lives a civilian as the fortune teller . He is very proud of his work and hates being called a petty thief. He wields a variety of weapons and has a ninja art which allows him to produce tarot cards. In Episode 36, he is arrested after being defeated and unmasked by Jiraiya and Reiha. He escapes from jail and in Episode 48, he fights Jiraiya again alongside Parchis and Silver Shark.
 : The boss of the Metallic Ninja Clan, a gang which plots to rule the world by using science for crime. His weapons includes two swords, a kusarigama that channels electricity, and a boomerang knife which he stores inside his right eyepatch. His  causes him to shoot a red laser from his armor and cause a magnetic storm, while his  allows him to hide in the shadow of his opponent. In Episode 23, he kidnaps three scientists (Dr. Smith, Dr. Brown, and Dr. Schmidt) with the help of the Sorcerers Clan, but his plot is foiled as a result of a quarrel with the Sorcerers Clan and he is ultimately defeated by Jiraiya. In Episode 40, he is rebuilt as "Gamesh 002" and cooperates with Demost to hunt down Jiraiya, but ends up being defeated by Mafuuba.

Items

Equipment
 : A suit of armor passed throughout the Togakure school, it is the suit worn by Toha when he becomes Jiraiya. When not in use, it is usually kept hidden inside the ceiling of the Bujinkan school. It was originally the suit worn by the alien that brought the Pako to Earth.
 : A sword passed throughout the Togakure school, it is Jiraiya's primary weapon. When Jiraiya yells the name of the sword, it becomes a shining laser blade. Any enemy defeated by a special technique performed with the blade will be wrapped around seven differently colored lights before vanishing. Only Toha, who is descended from the space alien that brought the sword, can use it to its full powers. Like the Jiraiya Suit, it was created from a meteorite that arrived from 300 light years away from Earth and fell into a glacier at the North Pole. When not in use, it is usually kept hidden inside a mirror within the Bujinkan school. It has its own fill as well. With this sword, Jiraiya can perform the following special techniques:
: A technique which cuts the enemy in half vertically, which is followed by a horizontal slice. It is Jiraiya's most commonly used finishing move.
: A finishing move in which the enemy is cut in half horizontally. A variation of the technique is also used which can take down up to three adversaries at the same time, which is used in Episodes 14 and 48.
: A technique in which the sword gathers lightning and when it radiates, it can attack numerous enemies at the same time. It is used in Episode 8 to break through Abdad's sorcery and again in Episode 18 to destroy the Devil King armor.
: Technique used during Jiraiya's second transformation. The technique slices enemy diagonally and then horizontally. It is first used during Episode 12 at the middle of a border several times.
: Technique used during Jiraiya's second transformation. While curving, Jiraiya slices the enemy in an x-like pattern. It is the technique uses in Episode 20 to destroy the Sorcerers Clan's "Buffalo" tank.
: Technique used during Jiraiya's second transformation. It is performed while Jiraiya is somersaulting in the air. Jiraiya uses in Episode 29 to destroy the Sorcerers Clan's "Giant Cannon" weapon.
: An enhanced version of the Front Bisection used during Jiraiya's second transformation, which finishes the enemy off faster than the regular version. Jiraiya uses in Episode 29 against Dokusai, wounding his left arm, as well as in Episode 45 to finish off the Paper Ninja Clan Leader.
: Technique used during Jiraiya's second transformation. The enemy is cut after Jiraiya rotates his sword. Used in Episode 44.
: The most essential technique of the Togakure school, which Jiraiya learns from Tetsuzan in Episode 49. The technique is capable of cutting the user itself when applied to a mirror. The technique managed to wound Demost, as well as destroy Dokusai's mask during the final episode.
 : A set of upgrade parts created by Dr. Smith that can be added to the Jiraiya Suit, they are introduced in Episode 11. It consists of a pair of shoulder pads and knee pads, a collar, and a special visor called the  that allows the wearer to analyze and see-through surroundings. They are equipped over the Jiraiya Suit during battle as part of a secondary transformation.
 : Jiraiya's raygun introduced in Episode 13, it appears to be a weapon handed down to the Yamaji family. It uses three different types of ammunition: a medical cartridge that shoots anesthetic rounds, a signal cartridge that shoots signal rounds, and a material destroying cartridge that can destroy rocks. The Jiraibuster is mainly used as a defensive weapon, since it is not capable of firing lethal shots.

Vehicles
 : Full length: 4405mm / Full width: 1725mm / Height: 1295mm / Total weight: 1470 kg. A modified sports car driven by Jiraiya. It is originally an ordinary black Nissan Fairlady Z that belonged to Toha until Dr. Smith decides to modify it, inspired by Tetsuzan's idea of combining science with ninjutsu. While it still resembles an ordinary car on the outside, it is equipped numerous special devices such as a state-of-the-art radar, pop-up-style machine guns inside the retractable light units, a missile and anchor launchers inside the hood, and makibishis behind the rear wheels. Its body has also been reinforced to make it durable enough to withstand any explosion. Its top speed is 310 km (approximately 190 mph).
 : Toha's car prior to being modified into the Black Saber. Three episodes later, it had Jiraiya Suit's helmet's forehead design incorporated into the bonnet.
 : The giant statue of a war god that was kept within the depths of Mount Kongō. Stands approximately 20 meters (or 66 feet) tall, it serves as the guardian deity of the Pako against the greatest evils. Jiraiya can fuse with Jiraishin and control its movement by transporting himself into its chest. It is said to had been built by Prince Shōtoku with the purposes of protecting Pako. While Jiraishin appears in a total of six episodes following its first appearance in Episode 34, the only times that it fights a giant enemy are in Episode 35 against the Sorcerer Behemoth Gohma and in the final episode against a giant Dokusai. When not in use, Jiraishin is kept underground inside a giant rock seal with Jiraishin's name inscribed that covers it from up to its neck, with its blow-back helmet part usually closed.
 : Wind Ninja Mafuba's superbike. It is equipped with a laser beam gun in the right side of the headlight. In the Episode 49, a shotgun was used as fake exhaust.

Pako
: Voiced by Jun Yoshida. An alien time capsule that fell from space during the 4th century B.C. It holds a mysterious super energy equivalent to the Sun itself, causing the Sorcerers Clan and most of the World Ninjas to fight fiercely to obtain it. Its true form is that of an energy being from the Dark Star that originally intended to invade the Earth, but was reformed when it experienced the kindness of earthlings. It can only communicate telepathically via Reiha, who is descended from one of the aliens that brought Pako to Earth.

Episodes
Episode 49 ended up airing on January 15, 1989, because Emperor Shōwa died on January 7, 1989.
 : written by Akira Nakahara, directed by Makoto Tsuji
 : written by Susumu Takaku, directed by Makoto Tsuji
 : written by Susumu Takaku, directed by Kaneharu Mitsumura
 : written by Kunio Fujii, directed by Kaneharu Mitsumura
 : written by Susumu Takaku, directed by Makoto Tsuji
 : written by Kunio Fujii, directed by Makoto Tsuji
 : written by Susumu Takaku, directed by Kaneharu Mitsumura
 : written by Kunio Fujii, directed by Kaneharu Mitsumura
 : written by Susumu Takaku, directed by Akihisa Okamoto
 : written by Susumu Takaku, directed by Akihisa Okamoto
 : written by Susumu Takaku, directed by Kaneharu Mitsumura
 : written by Kunio Fujii, directed by Kaneharu Mitsumura
 : written by Susumu Takaku, directed by Itaru Orita
 : written by Kenji Terada, directed by Itaru Orita
 : written by Susumu Takaku, directed by Kaneharu Mitsumura
 : written by Kenji Terada, directed by Kaneharu Mitsumura
 : written by Kunio Fujii, directed by Makoto Tsuji
 : written by Kunio Fujii, directed by Makoto Tsuji
 : written by Susumu Takaku, directed by Itaru Orita
 : written by Akira Nakahara, directed by Itaru Orita
 : written by Kenji Terada, directed by Kaneharu Mitsumura
 : written by Takashi Kuki, directed by Kaneharu Mitsumura
 : written by Kenji Terada, directed by Makoto Tsuji
 : written by Susumu Takaku, directed by Makoto Tsuji
 : written by Susumu Takaku, directed by Akihisa Okamoto
 : written by Kunio Fujii, directed by Akihisa Okamoto
 : written by Takashi Kuki and Tsuyoshi Koike, directed by Kaneharu Mitsumura
 : written by Susumu Takaku, directed by Kaneharu Mitsumura
 : written by Tsuyoshi Koike, directed by Makoto Tsuji
 : written by Nobuo Ogizawa, directed by Makoto Tsuji
 : written by Susumu Takaku, directed by Akihisa Okamoto
 : written by Kunio Fujii, directed by Akihisa Okamoto
 : written by Nobuo Ogizawa, directed by Kaneharu Mitsumura
 : written by Susumu Takaku, directed by Kaneharu Mitsumura
 : written by Susumu Takaku, directed by Kaneharu Mitsumura
 : written by Nobuo Ogizawa, directed by Akihisa Okamoto
 : written by Susumu Takaku, directed by Akihisa Okamoto
 : written by Susumu Takaku, directed by Kiyoshi Arai
 : written by Susumu Takaku, directed by Kiyoshi Arai
 : written by Noboru Sugimura, directed by Kaneharu Mitsumura
 : written by Susumu Takaku, directed by Kaneharu Mitsumura
 : written by Nobuo Ogizawa, directed by Kaneharu Mitsumura
 : written by Noboru Sugimura, directed by Akihisa Okamoto
 : written by Tsuyoshi Koike, directed by Akihisa Okamoto
 : written by Kunio Fujii, directed by Kiyohiko Miyasaka
 : written by Nobuo Ogizawa, directed by Kiyohiko Miyasaka
 : written by Kunio Fujii and Yasuhiro Fujii, directed by Kiyoshi Arai
 : written by Susumu Takaku, directed by Kaneharu Mitsumura
 : written by Susumu Takaku, directed by Kaneharu Mitsumura
 : written by Susumu Takaku, directed by Kaneharu Mitsumura

Cast

Regulars
: 
: 
: 
: 
: Issei Hirota
: 
Benikiba: 
Kumo-Gozen's "front" form: Machiko Soga
Kumo-Gozen's "rear" form: Hizuru Uratani

Semi-regulars and guest stars
Henry Rakuchin: Masayuki Suzuki (eps 1, 3, 4, 6, 25, 36 & 46)
Haburamu: Kin Oomae (ep 3 & 15)
Abdad: Ulf Otsuki (ep 8)
Maira: Emi Sato (ep 8)
Dr. Smith: Chris "Akshara" Reynolds (eps 11, 16 & 23)
Oruha: Shohei Kusaka (eps 12, 26 & 45)
Kasumi Mimura: Megumi Ueno (eps 12, 26 & 45)
Kensuke Mimura: Hiroshi Seigo (ep 12)
Tao (child): Yuki Shibuya (eps 14 & 44)
Kaze: Jyunichi Haruta (ep. 16)
Yumeha: Tamao Matsugi (eps 17, 18 & 32)
Kurozaru: Bun Nakamura (eps 17 & 18)
Genichiro Murakami (Flower Ninja's Leader): Koji Kawai (ep. 17)
Satsuki: Ayako Kanda (ep 22)
Satsuki's father: Daisuke Fujimori (ep 22)
Satsuki's mother: Yasuko Kato (ep 22)
Dr. Brown: Ronnie Santana (ep 23)
Dr. Schmidt: Malcom McLeod (ep 23)
Kaiyo Tsumoto: Botan Senba (ep 25)
Kaiyo's Husband: Ippei Kawashima (ep 25)
Shintaro "Shin" Yazaka: Kaname Kawai (ep 26)
Development Company's President: Eiichi Kikuchi (ep 26)
Yajirō Iyo: Kenji Ohba (ep 27)
Chiyo: Miho Tojo (eps 28, 42 & 50)
Hanzo: Koji Matoba (eps 28 & 42)
Shogo: Eisuke Yoda (ep 28)
Doctor: Atsuo Mori (ep 28)
Katherine: Dorothée (eps 29 & 31)
Kuroi Ibara: Kazuoki Takahashi (ep 30)
Genchi Koshimura: Jun Tatara (ep 30)
Devil Cats: Mickey Curtis (ep 36)
Jane: Sumiko Kakizaki (ep 40)
Sanae Yamaji/Akiko Matsumoto: Yukiko Yoshino (ep 42)
Tao (adult): Aya Shindo (ep 44)
Paper Ninja Clan Leader: Katsuhiko Kobayashi (ep 45)

Voice actors
Tetsuzan Yamaji: Dai Nagasawa
Dokusai: Shozo Izuka
Retsukiba: Shingo Hiromori
Karasutengu #1: Ittoku Yamanaka
Karasutengu #2: Moichi Saitō
Karasutengu #3, Gyuma, Gamesh: Toku Nishio
Mafūba, Baron Owl, Alamsa, Uha, Strowver, Rocketman (ep 14): Atsuo Mori
Rocketman: Seiichi Hirai
Beni Tokage: Takeshi Kuwabara (ep.5), Teiji Oomiya (ep. 31)
Beni Tokage (ep. 41), Chang Kung Fu, Makumba: Eiji Maruyama
Chang Kung Fu's son: Michirō Iida
Green Dragon, Parchis, Silver Shark, Demost: Eisuke Yoda
Sylvia: Naoko Matsui
Akunobo Sugitani: Takeshi Watabe
Pako: Jun Yoshida
Narrator: Toru Ohira

Stunts
Jiraiya (Power Protect Suit): Koji Matoba (eps 11–26, 29-40 & 42–47), Takumi Tsutsui (eps 28 & 48–50)
Org Ninja Dokusai/Ninja (ep 13)/Kaze (ep 16)/Akunobo Sugitani (ep 28): Noriaki Kaneda
Star Ninja Retsukiba: Ryo Nagamine
Demonic Ninja Sylvia: Miyuki Nagato
Wind Ninja Mafuuba: Jyunichi Haruta (eps 16, 29, 40 & 46), Shunya Shinoda (eps 49 & 50)
Anthropomorphic Ninja Vermillion Tokage: Toshiyuki Kikuchi, Hiroshi Seki
Lightning Ninja Wild: Michael Callman, Jiro Ishii
Holy Ninja Alamsa: Yasuhiro Takeuchi, Tetsuya Aoki
Castle Ninja Baron Fukorou: Masahiro Sudo. Toshiyuki Kikuchi
Explosive Ninja Rocketman: Hiroshi Seki, Yasuhiro Takeuchi
Chinese Ninja Green Dragon: Tsutomu Kitagawa (eps 2, 10 & 11), Satoru Katagiri (ep 49)
Fire Ninja Chang Kung-Fu (father and son): Hideo Ninomiya
Feast Ninja Gyuma: Makoto Kenmochi (ep 13), Haruyuki Higuchi (ep 42), Hiroyuki Nonaka (ep 49)
Metallic Ninja Gamesh: Richii Seike, Shuji Sakamoto
Space Ninja Demost: Richii Seike (eps 37–39), Naoki Oofuji (eps 40, 41, 46, 48 & 49), Hirokazu Shoji (without head)
Metallic Ninja Gamesh 002: Richii Seike
Darkness Ninja Devil Cats: Naoki Oofuji (eps 36 & 48), Atsuya Nishimura (ep 49)
Changing Ninja Parchis: Toshiyuki Kikuchi (eps 19, 22, 31 & 40), Satoru Katagiri (ep 48), Hiroki Nakayama (ep 49)
Fire: Hiroshi Seki
Water: Shogo Shiotani
Tree: Tetsuya Aoki
Earth: Yukio Yada
Beast Ninja Makumba/Miraculous Ninja Strowver: Hiroyuki Uchida
Bird Ninja Karasutengus: Noriaki Kaneda, Hiroyuki Uchida, Takeshi Miyazaki, Shoji Hachisuka, Kazutoshi Yokoyama
Jiraishin: Noboru Tsurumaki
Beast Ninja Makumba's Brother: Hiroshi Seki

Songs
Opening theme

Lyrics: Keisuke Yamakawa
Composition: 
Arrangement: 
Artist: Akira Kushida
Ending theme
"SHI·NO·BI '88"
Lyrics: Keisuke Yamakawa
Composition: Kisaburō Suzuki
Arrangement: Osamu Totsuka
Artist: Akira Kushida

Adaptations
The suit for Jiraiya was used in Power Rangers Super Ninja Steel in the episode "Sheriff Skyfire" (which uses footage from episode 34 of Ninninger) for the titular character (voiced by Mark Mitchinson) who works as an intergalactic police officer. He crashed the latest episode of "Galaxy Warriors" to arrest Blammo for his illegal demolition activity. Madame Odius appeared where she tricks Sheriff Skyfire into going after the Rangers. Both sides duel until they rescue an elderly woman that nearly got caught in the crossfire. Realizing that he was lied to, Sheriff Skyfire agrees to help the Rangers while being informed of every monster that attacked Earth on Madame Odius' behalf. In addition, he gives a morality lesson to the Rangers on respecting law enforcement like when Hayley Foster got ticketed by Summer Cove High School's security guard Clint. When the bomb that Blammo planted was destroyed, Sheriff Skyfire assisted in fighting Blammo and lent his sword to Brody Romero to defeat Blammo. After Blammo was hit by the Gigantify Ray, Sheriff Skyfire watched the fight. Following Blammo's destruction, Sheriff Skyfire thanked the Rangers and teleported away to receive his next assignment from his superiors.

References

1988 Japanese television series debuts
1989 Japanese television series endings
Ninja fiction
Martial arts television series
Metal Hero Series
TV Asahi original programming